Vladeta is a Serbian masculine given name, derived from the Slavic element vlad meaning "to rule, ruler" and the suffix -eta. It is attested in Serbian society since the Middle Ages. The patronymic surname Vladetić is derived from the name. It may refer to:

Vladeta Janković (born 1940), Serbian philologist and politician
Vladeta Jerotić (born 1924), Serbian psychiatrist and Jungian psychologist
 "Bata Kanda" (born 1938), Serbian musician
 (1905–1976), Yugoslav footballer, SK Jugoslavija
 (1898–1969), Yugoslav intelligence agent, Interpol representative, and diplomat
 (1911–1941), Yugoslav Spanish fighter
 (born 1940), Serbian folklorist
 (1928–2003), Serbian poet

See also
Slavic names

References

Sources
 

Slavic masculine given names
Serbian masculine given names